Kapu refers to a social grouping of agriculturists found primarily in the southern Indian state of Andhra Pradesh and Telangana. Kapus are primarily an agrarian community, forming a heterogeneous peasant caste.

They are classified as a Forward caste in Andhra Pradesh, where they are the dominant community in the districts of East Godavari and West Godavari. They are distinct from three other Kapu communities that were present in the state prior to its bifurcation with the creation of Telangana in 2014. The Munnuru Kapu are found primarily in Telangana, the Turpu Kapu in the areas of Srikakulam, Vizianagaram and Visakhapatnam, and the Balija in Rayalaseema. The first two of these other three communities are classified as Other Backward Classes.

Etymology
Kāpu literally means cultivator or agriculturist in Telugu. Various subgroups of Kapus branched off into separate communities in the post-Kakatiya period (Velamas, Panta Kapus and Pakanati Kapus—both of whom got labelled Reddys, and Kapus of Kammanadu—eventually labelled Kammas). The remaining Kapus continue to use the original label. All the cultivator caste clusters have a common ancestry in the legends. According to Cynthia Talbot, the transformation of occupational identities as caste labels occurred in the late Vijayanagara period (17th century) or later.

Status

The Kapu are considered to be a Sat-Shudra community in the traditional Hindu ritual ranking system known as varna.

The Kapu have been described by Srinivasulu as a "dominant peasant caste in coastal Andhra", with the Telaga listed as "a backward peasant caste" and the Balija as a peasant caste who hold Lingayat beliefs. Srinisavulu has analysed the 1921 census of India to cause alignment with the present-day state and classification system, from which he concludes that Kapus (including Reddys) amounted to around 17 percent of the state's then population and were regarded as a Forward caste, whilst the Balija and Telaga were regarded as Backward castes, comprising 3 percent and 5 percent of the 1921 population, respectively.

Srinivasulu notes that the Reddys and Kammas are the politically dominant communities of Andhra Pradesh and Telangana, and that the Kapus are among a group with lesser but still significant influence, despite their small population. They are particularly effective in the districts of East Godavari and West Godavari, although Srinivasulu notes that "The Kapus of the coastal districts are distinct from the Munnur Kapus of Telangana. While the former are fairly prosperous, the political emergence of the latter, who are part of the OBC category, is a recent phenomenon."

The official government classifications rarely distinguished between the Kapu sub-castes. All Kapus were classified as forming a backward caste in 1915 by the British government of the Madras Presidency, which remained in force even after the formation of Andhra Pradesh until 1956. In that year, the government of Andhra Pradesh removed Kapus from the list of backward castes. Even though various governments have since made efforts to include them again, the efforts have not been successful. In 1968, the Anantha Raman Commission set up by the Andhra Pradesh government recognised Munnuru Kapus and Turpu Kapus as backward classes, but not the Kapus as a whole. The Mandal Commission set up by the Government of India in the 1980s recommended that Kapus be included among the Other Backward Classes (OBC). But the state governments were entrusted with finalising the list of castes for the OBC category. The state commission headed by N. K. Muralidhar Rao did not recommend any change to the status of the other Kapu castes.

In early 2016, the Kapus of the residual Andhra Pradesh state launched an agitation demanding the OBC status, leading to violent protests. The Indian National Congress party and the YSR Congress party have supported their demand. The then-ruling Telugu Desam Party was said to be opposed to the demand.

Notable people
 Kurma Venkata Reddy Naidu
 C. K. Nayudu
 Vangaveeti Mohana Ranga
 Dasari Narayana Rao
 Chiranjeevi
 Pawan Kalyan

References
Citations

Bibliography

Further reading

 
Telugu society
Indian castes
Social groups of Andhra Pradesh
Agricultural castes